JKP may refer to:
 James Knox Polk, the 11th president of the United States
 Jessica Kingsley Publishers, a book publisher
 Jammu and Kashmir Police
 Jharkhand Party, an Indian political party
 Jaunā konservatīvā partija, a Latvian political party
 Paku language
 John Keith Prothero, pseudonym of author Ada Elizabeth Chesterton (nee Jones), wife of Cecil Edward Chesterton, brother of G K Chesterton